Mats Hans Moraing (born 20 June 1992) is a German professional tennis player. He achieved his career high ATP singles ranking of world No. 115 on 23 May 2022.

Personal life
Mats is the son of former German tennis player Heiner Moraing and is coached by his uncle Peter Moraing, also a former professional player.

Professional career

2013–17
Moraing contested mainly on the ITF Futures Tour, where he won eight titles.

2018: Top 150 debut
Moraing won his maiden ATP Challenger singles title at the Koblenz Open. He made his top 150 debut on 16 July 2018 at world No. 149.

2019: ATP debut
Moraing made his ATP main draw debut as a qualifier at the Halle Open.

2021
Moraing won his first ATP Tour-level match at the Belgrade Open. As a lucky loser, he defeated Egor Gerasimov in the first round after saving 3 match points and a 4–6, 0–4 deficit. In the second round he lost in straight sets to the number 1 seed and world No. 1 Novak Djokovic.

2022: Top 125 debut
He made his debut in the top 125 on 21 March 2022.

Singles performance timeline 

''Current through the 2022 US Open.

ATP Challenger and ITF Futures finals

Singles: 22 (13–9)

Doubles: 7 (3–4)

References

External links
 
 

1992 births
Living people
German male tennis players
Sportspeople from Mülheim
Tennis people from North Rhine-Westphalia
21st-century German people